Joseph Tait (October 21, 1839 – March 18, 1911) was an Ontario businessman and political figure. He represented Toronto in the Legislative Assembly of Ontario as a Liberal member from 1890 to 1894.

He was born in Kirkcudbrightshire, Scotland in 1839, the son of John Tait, and trained as a baker. In 1863, he married Elizabeth McKie. Tait travelled to Pennsylvania in 1871 and then settled at Toronto in 1872, where he established a bakery. He served on the city council, was a member of the Toronto Board of Trade and a director for the Globe Printing Company. Tait was also a Methodist preacher. He married Susan Stibbard in 1876 after the death of his first wife. He was defeated by George Frederick Marter in his bid to be reelected in 1894. In 1897, Tait was named registrar for the Surrogate Court in York County, at which time he retired from business.

Tait died in 1911 after falling down an elevator shaft and fracturing his hip.

External links 

The Canadian parliamentary companion, 1891 JA Gemmill
Member's parliamentary history for the Legislative Assembly of Ontario
The Canadian men and women of the time ..., HJ Morgan (1898)
Commemorative biographical record of the county of York, Ontario (1907)

1839 births
1911 deaths
Canadian Methodists
Ontario Liberal Party MPPs
Scottish emigrants to Canada
Methodist ministers